Nagash or Lex Icon (real name Stian André Hinderson; born Stian André Arnesen, 7 May 1978) is a Norwegian black metal musician. He plays guitar, bass, drums, keyboards and does vocals.

Biography
Nagash began writing music in 1992, together with Fafnir and Glaurung for a project called Troll. Fafnir and Glaurung soon left the band, but Nagash continued Troll as a solo project, playing guitar and keyboard. Wanting to be in a band and "express himself on all levels", he founded the band Covenant together with Amund Svensson in 1993. (However, after having released two albums, they had to change the name to The Kovenant due to a Swedish band already called Covenant).

Gaining a good reputation in the black metal scene, Nagash was recruited as bass player for Dimmu Borgir in 1996. In 1999, he left Dimmu Borgir to concentrate on his career with The Kovenant. At the same time, he changed his stage name to Lex Icon in order to reflect the artistic direction The Kovenant had taken.

In 2004, now known as Lex Icon, he teamed up with Shagrath and formed a new heavy metal band called Chrome Division. In this band he played drums.

Lex has reported that he had to leave Chrome Division and is now 100% dedicated working on the next The Kovenant album. He also currently reported to have joined one of his favorite bands, Crowhead.

He has also been involved in Nocturnal Breed (as a session drummer, under the name of Rick Hellraiser) and Carpe Tenebrum.

From the beginning of 2008, he recruited a full lineup for his former solo project, Troll. Their latest album Neo-Satanic Supremacy has been released in early 2010 through Napalm Records.

For a short while in 2015-2016, Nagash was a member of Norwegian black/thrash metal band Kvesta.

Discography
Dimmu Borgir
Devil's Path (1996)
Enthrone Darkness Triumphant (1997)
Godless Savage Garden (1998)
Spiritual Black Dimensions (1999)
The Kovenant
In Times Before the Light (1997)
Nexus Polaris (1998)
Animatronic (1999)
SETI (2003)
Troll
Trollstorm over Nidingjuv (1995)
Drep de Kristne (1996)
The Last Predators (2000)
Universal (2001)
Neo-Satanic Supremacy (2010)
Carpe Tenebrum
Majestic Nothingness (1997)
Mirrored Hate Painting (1999)
Dreaded Chaotic Reign (2002)

References

Sources
Interview with Lex Icon by MetalKings.com

1978 births
Living people
Dimmu Borgir members
Norwegian black metal musicians
Norwegian multi-instrumentalists
Musicians from Hamar
Place of birth missing (living people)
Black metal singers
The Kovenant members
Chrome Division members